Jacob Batalon (born October 9, 1996) is an American actor. Batalon achieved international recognition playing Ned Leeds in five Marvel Cinematic Universe superhero films, beginning with Spider-Man: Homecoming (2017), cameos in Avengers: Infinity War (2018) and Avengers: Endgame (2019), and in Spider-Man: Far From Home (2019) and Spider-Man: No Way Home (2021). He also played Keon in the Netflix film Let It Snow (2019).

Early life
Jacob Batalon was born on October 9, 1996, in Hawaii, to Filipino parents. Batalon has seven half-siblings: a brother and a sister from his mother, and three brothers and two sisters from his father.

Upon graduating from the private Catholic school St. Anthony's School, he went to Damien Memorial School, then Batalon attended Kapi'olani Community College to study music theory, but later dropped out. He then took a two-year program to study acting at the New York Conservatory for Dramatic Arts.

Career
Batalon made his acting debut in the 2016 film North Woods.

As part of the Marvel Cinematic Universe, he first appeared as Peter Parker's best friend Ned Leeds in Spider-Man: Homecoming (2017). It was Batalon's first major role. He reprised the role in Avengers: Infinity War (2018), Avengers: Endgame, Spider-Man: Far From Home, (both 2019) and Spider-Man: No Way Home (2021).

In 2018, Batalon played one of the bodies inhabited by spirit A in the young-adult film Every Day.

In 2021, Batalon was cast as the titular Reginald in Syfy's dramedy series Reginald the Vampire.

Personal life
In 2021, he lost  for his role in Spider-Man: No Way Home.

Filmography

Film

Television

Web series

References

External links
 

1996 births
Living people
21st-century American male actors
American male actors of Filipino descent
American male film actors
American male television actors
Male actors from Honolulu